Gordon Bell (born 24 July 1969) is a Scottish singer-songwriter based in Moscow, Russia.

Background
He is prolific having released fifteen albums in as many years. Eight of those albums were under the pseudonym Gustav Bertha. His breakthrough fifth album My Life as a Dog (distributed in Switzerland through RecRec) was well received: Swiss newspaper Der Bund called it 'Wunderbar',. The Swiss press has also dubbed him with the slightly more ambiguous title, "The World's least-known Scot". He stopped working under the Gustav Bertha pseudonym in 2008 to write and play as Gordon Bell. Bell's music could be compared to a strange cross between fellow Glaswegians Ivor Cutler and Alex Harvey. He has a penchant for storytelling in his songs. He also spent 15 years as lead singer with a tribute to The Sensational Alex Harvey Band – Not The Sensational Alex Harvey Band and now fronts the rock band Giant Stone Eater who play a mix of covers (especially songs connected with Alex Harvey) and Bell's own songs.

Discography

with One in Five
Five Flew Over the Hatchery (1991)
with Psychoannie
Amoeba (1993)
as plasticpsychobabble
StranGe enchantment (1999)
submerging meadows green boundaries (2000)
blurred visions for fuzzy strangers (2000)
with The Secret Life of Andrew Aston
Caffeine Injunction (2000)
as Gustav Bertha
Songs for Gigi (2001)
The Hose Room (2002)
Café Crème (2002)
babble (2003)
My Life as a Dog (2004)
Defective (2005)
z:06 (2006 – compilation)
small adventures in the great domestic wilderness (2007)
True North (2008)
as Gordon Bell
Songs for the Broken Hearted (2009)
The Lost Art of Penance (2010)
"The 12 Uses of a Dead Tape Cassette" (2011)
"A Day Trip to the Sea" (2012)
as Gordon Bell and the Sinking Ships
"Animal Kingdom" EP (2011)

References

External links
Gordon Bell's official website
Gordon Bell & The Sinking Ships
Not The Sensational Alex Harvey Band

1969 births
Living people
Scottish pop singers
Scottish songwriters